Brad Corrigan (born August 27, 1974) is a musician who is a member of the indie band Dispatch, which reunited in 2011 after a hiatus of several years. He is often known by the stage name Braddigan and has been pursuing a successful solo effort since 2003 under that name, having released two albums independently on his own label, Third Surfer Music.

Personal life
Corrigan was born in Denver, Colorado, and is a graduate of Littleton High School. After playing lacrosse at Middlebury College, he joined Pete Heimbold in Woodriver Bandits. They got together with Chad Urmston to create the band Dispatch. Braddigan bandmates include Reinaldo DeJesus from Puerto Rico, Tiago Machado from Brazil, and Paul Stivitts from New York City.

Corrigan has made numerous visits to Managua, Nicaragua, where poverty and social injustice are prevalent. He founded a non-profit organization, Love Light & Melody, dedicated to battling physical, emotional and spiritual effects of extreme poverty. Corrigan believes everyone can make a difference. In his own words, “It’s never what you do in life, but the heart with which you do it." His second studio album, The Captive, draws its inspiration from the band's experiences in Managua. On December 17, 2013, he released his first solo album in six years, titled Someday is Today, which took three years to make.

Equipment

Guitars
 Taylor Acoustic w/cutaway

Discography
For discography of Dispatch, see Dispatch Discography

EPs
2002: Dirt Level Demos
2003: Take Two
2007: Braddigan and Friends

Studio albums
2005: Watchfires - Third Surfer Music
2007: The Captive - Third Surfer Music
2013: Someday is Today - Third Surfer Music

Live albums
2002: Live at the Gothic
2006: Live at Goucher College
2008: Live at the Belly Up - Third Surfer Music

DVDs
2007: Side of the Road - Third Surfer Music, Kasey Kirby

Compilation albums
 2005: The Relief Project: Vol. I by Various Artists (as part of The Relief Project)

References

External links
Braddigan.com, Official Braddigan website
Braddigan collection on the Internet Archive's live music archive

Living people
American rock guitarists
American male guitarists
1974 births
American social activists
Musicians from Denver
Guitarists from Colorado
21st-century American guitarists
21st-century American male musicians
Dispatch (band) members